Abaco Air Limited was a scheduled and charter airline based in the Bahamas. Its main base was in Marsh Harbour, Abaco Islands, Bahamas. It ceased operations in 2013.

Notes

External links 
 

Defunct airlines of the Bahamas
Airlines disestablished in 2013